Natalia Vasiliyevna Laschenova (born September 16, 1973 in Jelgava, Latvian SSR, Soviet Union) is a retired Soviet gymnast. Laschenova competed at the 1988 Summer Olympics and the 1989 World Artistic Gymnastics Championships. Laschenova is best known for her difficult skills, deceptive power, strong technique and highly expressive dance.

Early career
Laschenova had started gymnastics at the age of 6, reaching the international gymnastics scene at age 12 with her first competition, the 1985 Riga International. Laschenova did well, placing 2nd in the all around, 2nd on vault and 1st on balance beam. Laschenova continued to compete internationally at the 1986 Belgian Gym Masters, 1986 Moscow News and 1987 US vs USSR.

1988-1989
Laschenova competed at the 1988 Summer Olympics, contributing to a team gold medal for the Soviet Union and placing 5th in the all around.
The following year she competed at the 1989 World Artistic Gymnastics Championships, where she won a silver medal in the all around along with a gold medal with the team.

Post 1989
Laschenova was hampered in 1990 by an injury. After the breakup of the Soviet Union, Latvia did not compete with most of the former Soviet states as the Unified Team meaning that Laschenova would be unable to make the 1992 Summer Olympics. She retired in 1991.

Recent news
In 2010 it was reported that Laschenova and her family were facing deportation from the United States, where she now lives in Marysville, Ohio and coaches in Hilliard, Ohio.

Competitive history

See also

List of select Jewish gymnasts

References

1973 births
Living people
Sportspeople from Jelgava
Latvian female artistic gymnasts
Soviet female artistic gymnasts
Honoured Masters of Sport of the USSR
Olympic gold medalists for the Soviet Union
Olympic gymnasts of the Soviet Union
Gymnasts at the 1988 Summer Olympics
Medalists at the World Artistic Gymnastics Championships
Olympic medalists in gymnastics
Medalists at the 1988 Summer Olympics
Latvian people of Russian descent